Keith Christopher Rowley  (born 24 October 1949) is a Trinidadian and Tobagonian politician serving as the seventh prime minister of Trinidad and Tobago, first elected into office on 9 September 2015 and again following the 2020 general election. He has led the People's National Movement (PNM) since May 2010 and was Leader of the Opposition from 2010 to 2015. He has also served as the Member of the House of Representatives for Diego Martin West since 1991. He is a volcanologist by profession, holding a doctorate in geology, specializing in geochemistry.

Early life
Rowley was born in Mason Hall, Tobago, raised by his grandparents, who were prominent Tobago farmers. He was a pupil of Bishop's High School in Tobago, and graduated from the University of the West Indies (Mona) from where he graduated with a BSc. Geology (First Class Honors). He then went on to earn an MSc (1974) and a PhD (1978) from the University of the West Indies at St. Augustine in geology, specializing in geochemistry. At the university, as researcher, he held the positions of research fellow and later as head the seismic research unit. Rowley was general manager of state-owned National Quarries Company Limited as well.

Political career 
Rowley entered politics in 1981, where he unsuccessfully contested the Tobago West seat in the general election of that year. To date he has the distinction of being the only People's National Movement candidate to have contested a seat in a General Election in both Tobago and Trinidad. He first served in Parliament as an Opposition Senator from 1987 to 1990 (3rd Parliament). Subsequently, he was appointed as Minister of Agriculture, Land and Marine Resources (4th Parliament), Minister of Planning and Development and Minister of Housing (as cabinet reshuffled) (8th Parliament) and Minister of Trade and Industry (9th Parliament) until he was fired by then Prime Minister Patrick Manning.

Leader of the Opposition
Following the People's National Movement's defeat in the 2010 general election, Rowley was appointed as Leader of the Opposition on the 1st June. He was then elected political leader of the People's National Movement as he was seen as the most capable to lead the party. As political leader he advocated implementation of the one man, one vote system within the party. Rowley has served on several parliamentary committees. In 2004, he chaired the Joint Select Committee of Parliament which examined and made recommendations for the live broadcasting of parliamentary debates. He served as the representative governor of Trinidad and Tobago for the Inter-American Development Bank and the Caribbean Development Bank.

Prime Minister
Rowley led the People's National Movement in the September 2015 general election, in which his party secured 23 out of 41 seats in the House of Representatives to form the government, defeating the previous People's Partnership coalition government. On 9 September 2015, Rowley was sworn in as Prime Minister of Trinidad and Tobago by President Anthony Carmona. 
He becomes the seventh Prime Minister of Trinidad and Tobago and the second Tobago-born Prime Minister. Rowley again led the People's National Movement to victory in the 10 August 2020 general election for a second term in government under his premiership. He was sworn in as Prime Minister of Trinidad and Tobago on 19 August by President Paula-Mae Weekes at the President's House in St. Anns after the opposition party asked for recounts to be done in marginal constituencies.

Cabinet 
He appointed the following people as his cabinet:

Personal life 
He is married to attorney-at-law Sharon Rowley and has three children.

References

External links

1949 births
Living people
 Members of the House of Representatives (Trinidad and Tobago)
People's National Movement politicians
Prime Ministers of Trinidad and Tobago
University of the West Indies alumni
Trinidad and Tobago geologists
Geochemists
Volcanologists